The demon core was a spherical  subcritical mass of plutonium  in diameter, manufactured during World War II by the United States nuclear weapon development effort, the Manhattan Project, as a fissile core for an early atomic bomb. The core was prepared for shipment as part of the third nuclear weapon to be used in Japan, but when Japan surrendered, the core was retained at Los Alamos for testing and potential later use. It was involved in two criticality accidents at the Los Alamos Laboratory on August 21, 1945, and May 21, 1946, each resulting in a fatality. Both experiments were designed to demonstrate how close the core was to criticality with a tamper, but in each case, the core was accidentally placed into a critical configuration. Physicists Harry Daghlian and Louis Slotin suffered acute radiation syndrome (ARS) and died soon after, while others present in the lab were also exposed.

Manufacturing and early history
It consisted of three parts: two plutonium-gallium hemispheres and a ring, designed to keep neutron flux from "jetting" out of the joined surface between the hemispheres during implosion. The core of the device used in the Trinity Test at the Alamogordo Bombing and Gunnery Range in July did not have such a ring.

The refined plutonium was shipped from the Hanford Site in Washington state to the Los Alamos Laboratory; an inventory document dated August 30 shows Los Alamos had expended "HS-1, 2, 3, 4; R-1" (the components of the Trinity and Nagasaki bombs) and had in its possession "HS-5, 6; R-2", finished and in the hands of quality control.  Material for "HS-7, R-3" was in the Los Alamos metallurgy section, and would also be ready by September 5 (it is not certain whether this date allowed for the unmentioned "HS-8s fabrication to complete the fourth core). The metallurgists used a plutonium-gallium alloy, which stabilized the  phase allotrope of plutonium so it could be hot pressed into the desired spherical shape. As plutonium was found to corrode readily, the sphere was then coated with nickel.

On August 10, Major General Leslie R. Groves, Jr., wrote to General of the Army George C. Marshall, the Chief of Staff of the United States Army, to inform him that:

Marshall added an annotation, "It is not to be released on Japan without express authority from the President", as President Harry S. Truman was waiting to see the effects of the first two attacks. On August 13, the third bomb was scheduled. It was anticipated that it would be ready by August 16 to be dropped on August 19. This was pre-empted by Japan's surrender on August 15, 1945, while preparations were still being made for it to be couriered to Kirtland Field. The third core remained at Los Alamos.

First incident
The core, assembled, was designed to be at "−5 cents". In this state there is only a small safety margin against extraneous factors that might increase reactivity, causing the core to become supercritical, and then prompt critical, a brief state of rapid energy increase.  These factors are not common in the environment; they are circumstances like the compression of the solid metallic core (which would eventually be the method used to explode the bomb), the addition of more nuclear material, or provision of an external reflector which would reflect outbound neutrons back into the core. The experiments conducted at Los Alamos leading to the two fatal accidents were designed to guarantee that the core was indeed close to the critical point by arranging such reflectors and seeing how much neutron reflection was required to approach supercriticality.

On August 21, 1945, the plutonium core produced a burst of neutron radiation that led to physicist Harry Daghlian's death. Daghlian made a mistake while performing neutron reflector experiments on the core. The core was placed within a stack of neutron-reflective tungsten carbide bricks and the addition of each brick moved the assembly closer to criticality. While attempting to stack another brick around the assembly, Daghlian accidentally dropped it onto the core and thereby caused the core to go well into supercriticality, a self-sustaining critical chain reaction. He quickly moved the brick off the assembly, but received a fatal dose of radiation. He died 25 days later from acute radiation poisoning.

Second incident

On May 21, 1946, physicist Louis Slotin and seven other personnel were in a Los Alamos laboratory conducting another experiment to verify the closeness of the core to criticality by the positioning of neutron reflectors. Slotin, who was leaving Los Alamos, was showing the technique to Alvin C. Graves, who would use it in a final test before the Operation Crossroads nuclear tests scheduled a month later at Bikini Atoll. It required the operator to place two half-spheres of beryllium (a neutron reflector) around the core to be tested and manually lower the top reflector over the core using a thumb hole on the top. As the reflectors were manually moved closer and farther away from each other, scintillation counters measured the relative activity from the core. The experimenter needed to maintain a slight separation between the reflector halves in order to stay below criticality. The standard protocol was to use shims between the halves, as allowing them to close completely could result in the instantaneous formation of a critical mass and a lethal power excursion.

Under Slotin's own unapproved protocol, the shims were not used and the only thing preventing the closure was the blade of a standard flat-tipped screwdriver manipulated in Slotin's other hand. Slotin, who was given to bravado, became the local expert, performing the test on almost a dozen occasions, often in his trademark blue jeans and cowboy boots, in front of a roomful of observers. Enrico Fermi reportedly told Slotin and others they would be "dead within a year" if they continued performing the test in that manner.  Scientists referred to this flirting with the possibility of a nuclear chain reaction as "tickling the dragon's tail", based on a remark by physicist Richard Feynman, who compared the experiments to "tickling the tail of a sleeping dragon".

On the day of the accident, Slotin's screwdriver slipped outward a fraction of an inch while he was lowering the top reflector, allowing the reflector to fall into place around the core. Instantly, there was a flash of blue light and a wave of heat across Slotin's skin; the core had become supercritical, releasing an intense burst of neutron radiation estimated to have lasted about a half second. Slotin quickly twisted his wrist, flipping the top shell to the floor. The heating of the core and shells stopped the criticality within seconds of its initiation, while Slotin's reaction prevented a recurrence and ended the accident. The position of Slotin's body over the apparatus also shielded the others from much of the neutron radiation, but he received a lethal dose of  neutron and  gamma radiation in under a second and died nine days later from acute radiation poisoning.

The nearest person to Slotin, Graves, who was watching over Slotin's shoulder and was thus partially shielded by him, received a high but non-lethal radiation dose. Graves was hospitalized for several weeks with severe radiation poisoning. He died 19 years later, at age 55, of a heart attack. While this may have been caused by Graves' exposure to radiation, the event may have been hereditary as his father also died of a heart attack.

The second accident was reported by the Associated Press on May 26, 1946: "Four men injured through accidental exposure to radiation in the government's atomic laboratory here [Los Alamos] have been discharged from the hospital and 'immediate condition' of four others is satisfactory, the Army reported today. Dr. Norris E. Bradbury, project director, said the men were injured last Tuesday in what he described as an experiment with fissionable material."

Medical studies
Follow-up research was conducted on the health of the men. An early report was published in 1951. A later report was compiled for the U.S. government and submitted in 1979.  A summary of its findings:

After these incidents the core, originally known as "Rufus", was referred to as the "demon core". Hands-on criticality experiments were stopped, and remote-control machines and TV cameras were designed by Schreiber, one of the survivors, to perform such experiments with all personnel at a quarter-mile distance.

Planned uses and fate of the core
The demon core was intended for use in the Operation Crossroads nuclear tests, but after the criticality accident, time was needed for its radioactivity to decline and for it to be re-evaluated for the effects of the fission products it held, some of which were highly neutron poisonous to the desired level of fission. The next two cores were shipped for use in Able and Baker, and the demon core was scheduled to be shipped later for the third test of the series, provisionally named Charlie, but that test was cancelled due to the unexpected level of radioactivity resulting from the underwater Baker test and the inability to decontaminate the target warships. The core was later melted down and the material recycled for use in other cores.

See also 
 Cecil Kelley criticality accident

References

External links
 

Nuclear weapons
Plutonium
Nuclear weapons program of the United States
Nuclear accidents and incidents in the United States
History of the Manhattan Project
Former objects